The following is a list of notable alumni and faculty of Northeastern University.

Alumni

Business

 Marc Raibert – founder and CEO, Boston Dynamics
 Nikesh Arora – President and Chief Operating Officer of SoftBank
 Jeff Bornstein – CFO, General Electric
 Robert A. Brooks – founder and CEO, Brooks Fiber Properties
 George Chamillard – former CEO, Teradyne, Inc.
 Jeff Clarke – CEO, Kodak
 Jeff Cooper – COO and co-founder, EPOX-Z Corporation
 Bob Davis – CEO and founder, Lycos
 Richard Egan – co-founder, EMC
 Shawn Fanning – founder, Napster
 Jerald G. Fishman – CEO, Analog Devices
 George Kariotis – founder, Alpha Industries
 Amin Khoury – founder and CEO, B/E Aerospace
 Andrew Left – activist short seller
 Roger Marino – co-founder of EMC; former part-owner of Pittsburgh Penguins
 Alan McKim – CEO and founder, Clean Harbors
 Larry Meyer – CEO, Uniqlo USA
 Srinath Narayanan – principal, Canaccord Adams
Jeffrey Rosen - billionaire businessman
 Peter W. Smith – investment banker, Republican activist
 Sy Sternberg – chairman and CEO, New York Life Insurance Company
 Biz Stone – co-founder of Twitter

Government and politics
 Jayson P. Ahern – Deputy Commissioner of U.S. Customs and Border Protection
 Olubanke King Akerele – Liberian Foreign Minister
 George F. Archambault – Pharmacy Liaison Officer for the United States Public Health Service
 Demetrius J. Atsalis – member of the Massachusetts House of Representatives (1999–2013)
 Thomas Calter – member of the Massachusetts House of Representatives (2007–present)
 Christie Carpino – member of the Connecticut House of Representatives
 Cheryl A. Coakley-Rivera – member of the Massachusetts House of Representatives (1999–2014)
 Mo Cowan – U.S. Senator of Massachusetts
 Harold Daniel Donohue – member of the U.S. House of Representatives (1947–1974)
 David Chu – member of the Legislative Council of Hong Kong (1997–2004) and the 9th and 10th National People's Congress of the People's Republic of China
 Patrick Duddy – U.S. Ambassador
 Richard Egan – U.S. Ambassador
 David Ferriero – 10th Archivist of the United States 
 Thomas Finneran – former Speaker of the Massachusetts House of Representatives (1996–2004)
 Zandra Flemister – first African American woman to serve as a U.S. Secret Service agent (1974–1978)
 Gordon D. Fox – Majority Leader of the Rhode Island House of Representatives (2010–2014)
 Peter Franchot – Comptroller of Maryland
 Maggie Hassan – Governor of New Hampshire (2013–2017) and the current junior United States senator from New Hampshire 
 Russell Holmes – member of the Massachusetts House of Representatives (2011–present)
 Roderick L. Ireland - Massachusetts Supreme Judicial Court Chief Justice
 Edward Jackamonis – speaker of the Wisconsin State Assembly
 James Franklin Jeffrey – U.S. Ambassador
 Lyndon LaRouche – perennial presidential candidate
 Hadassah Lieberman – wife of Connecticut senator Joseph Lieberman
 Adnan Aurangzeb Miangul – former Pakistani parliament member and Prince of Swat, Pakistan
 Paul Parks –Massachusetts Secretary of Education (1975–1979)
 John O. Pastore – Governor of Rhode Island
 Ari Porth – member of the Florida House of Representatives
 Theodore Speliotis – member of the Massachusetts House of Representatives
 Karen Spilka – member of the Massachusetts State Senate 
 Wallace Stickney – Director of the Federal Emergency Management Agency under President George H. W. Bush
Thomas Winkowski - He was previously Acting Commissioner of U.S. Customs and Border Protection (CBP). Former retired former Principal Deputy Assistant Secretary for U.S. Immigration and Customs Enforcement (ICE).
 Leslie Winner – North Carolina State Senator

Judiciary
Margot Botsford – Justice, Massachusetts Supreme Judicial Court
Linda Dalianis – Justice, New Hampshire Supreme Court
Dana Fabe – Chief Justice, Alaska Supreme Court
Edward Hennessey – Justice, Massachusetts Supreme Judicial Court
Peter T. Zarella – Justice, Connecticut Supreme Court

Science and technology
Hans Baumann – inventor and engineer
George D. Behrakis – inventor of Tylenol
Amy Bishop – former professor; convicted murderer
Hans R. Camenzind – inventor of the 555 timer IC
Richard P. Gabriel – expert on the Lisp programming language
Gregory Jarvis – astronaut
Eugene F. Lally – aerospace engineer, photographer, entrepreneur
Yale Patt – engineer
Albert Sacco – astronaut

Military
Mark P. Fitzgerald – United States Navy Admiral
Richard I. Neal – United States Marine Corps General

Journalism and communications
 Ernie Anastos – New York City TV news anchorman
 Eddie Andelman – sports radio talk show host (MBA)
 Bill Barnwell – sportswriter, ESPN, Grantland
 Michelle Bonner – ESPN/Sports Center/CNN/FOX Sports Anchor/Talent/Host, Reporter
 Fred Cusick – sportscaster
 Richard Daniels – former president, Boston Globe
 Nat Hentoff – contributing editor, The New Yorker Magazine
 Dan Mason – radio host
 Will McDonough – sportswriter, Boston Globe 
 Don Orsillo – TV broadcaster
 Walter V. Robinson – investigative journalist, 2003 Pulitzer Prize for Public Service recipient
 Michael Slackman – International Managing Editor, The New York Times

Arts and entertainment
 Al Barile – singer, guitarist for hardcore punk band SS Decontrol
 Earle Brown – composer, developed open-form scores
 Joy Browne - radio talk show host
 Jose F. Buscaglia - philosopher, historian, social scientist
 Terry Carter – actor, Sgt. Joe Broadhurst in McCloud and Colonel Tigh in the original Battlestar Galactica
 Carla Cook – Grammy-nominated jazz vocalist
 Jane Curtin – actress, comedian, and founding member of Saturday Night Live 
 Michael J. Epstein – filmmaker and musician
 Martín Espada – poet
 Damien Fahey – former host of the MTV program TRL
Toby Fox – game designer and developer of Undertale
 Mohammed Saeed Harib – creator of Freej
 Alex Garcia – Food Network chef
 Meredith Garniss – visual artist and landscape painter
Sidney Gish - singer/songwriter
 Alan Catello Grazioso – Emmy Award winning television producer, director and editor
 Courtney Hunt – writer and director, whose film Frozen River was nominated for an Academy Award
 Beverly Johnson – supermodel and actress
 Aisha Kahlil – dancer, singer
 Barbara Kopple – documentary filmmaker
 Diana Lemieux – freelance photographer
 Patrice O'Neal – comedian and actor
 Peter Orner – fiction writer
 Jillian Wheeler – singer/songwriter
 Wendy Williams – radio and television, host of The Wendy Williams Show

Academia and nonprofit
William M. Fowler – author, professor, and former Director of the Massachusetts Historical Society
 Michael R. Lane – 15th president of Emporia State University
Dean Tong – author and consultant
Michael L. Tushman – organizational theorist, professor at Harvard Business School

Sports

 Zachary Aston-Reese – NHL, Pittsburgh Penguins
 José Juan Barea – Dallas Mavericks, NBA
 Harry Barnes – San Diego Rockets, NBA
 Ed Barry – Boston Bruins, National Hockey League (NHL)
 Sandy Beadle – Winnipeg Jets, NHL
 Bruce Bickford –gold medal-winning distance runner
 Randy Bucyk – Montreal Canadiens, Calgary Flames, NHL
 Joe Callahan – Boston Bees, MLB
 Lynn Chiavaro basketball player and coach
 Art Chisholm – Boston Bruins, NHL
 Rob Cowie – Los Angeles Kings, NHL
 Kendall Coyne – silver and gold medalist United States women's national ice hockey team
 Jim Fahey – NHL defenseman, New Jersey Devils
 Amber Ferreira – professional triathlete 
 Tony Fryklund – professional mixed martial arts fighter
 Adam Gaudette – Hobey Baker Award recipient, NHL center, Vancouver Canucks
 Chelsey Goldberg  – ice hockey player, Boston Blades, CWHL
 Scott Gruhl – Pittsburgh Penguins, NHL 
 "Wild" Bill Hunnefield – Major League Baseball (MLB) 
Shawn James – professional basketball player for Maccabi Tel Aviv
 Sean Jones – National Football League
 Steven Langton – United States Olympian (Bobsled) 
 Dave Leitao – college basketball coach
 Reggie Lewis – Boston Celtics
 Pat Mason – college baseball coach at Virginia Tech
 Dan McGillis – NHL defenseman
 Perry Moss – 1986 Washington Bullets, Philadelphia 76ers, 1987 Golden State Warriors
 Chris Nilan – Montreal Canadiens, Boston Bruins, New York Rangers
 Jamie Oleksiak –NHL, Dallas Stars
 Adam Ottavino – 1st-round pick in 2006 MLB draft, pitcher for St. Louis Cardinals (2010), Colorado Rockies (2012–2018), New York Yankees (2019-2020) Boston Red Sox (2021-Present)
 Carlos Peña – MLB first baseman/outfielder, Oakland Athletics, Detroit Tigers, Boston Red Sox, Tampa Bay Rays
 David Poile - NHL executive
 Bruce Racine – NHL goaltender, St. Louis Blues
 Dan Ross – NFL Cincinnati Bengals and Super Bowl record setter
 Michael Ryan – NHL left winger, Buffalo Sabres
 Florence Schelling – goaltender for the Switzerland's Women's Ice Hockey Team
 Dylan Sikura – NHL center, Chicago Blackhawks
 Brian Sullivan – NHL, 1992–93 New Jersey Devils
 Harry Swartz (born 1996) - soccer player
 Josh Heinrich Taves – NFL football player, 2000–02, Oakland Raiders and Carolina Panthers
 Brad Thiessen - NHL, Pittsburgh Penguins
 Jocko Thompson – MLB pitcher, 1948–51 Philadelphia Phillies
 Johnny Tobin – MLB, 1932 New York Giants
 Shaun Tomson (born 1955) - South African world champion surfer
 Joe Vitale – NHL, center for Pittsburgh Penguins
 Jason Vosler (born 1993) - baseball third baseman for the San Francisco Giants 
 Ashley Wagner (born 1991), figure skater
 Jim Walsh - Buffalo Sabres, NHL
 Kurt Walker – NHL, 1975–78 Toronto Maple Leafs
 Rick Weitzman – 1968, World Champion, Boston Celtics
 Keith Willis – NFL, Pittsburgh Steelers
 Hillary Witt – assistant coach for the United States women's national ice hockey team in the Sochi 2014 Olympics
 George Yankowski – MLB, 1942 Philadelphia Athletics, 1949 Chicago White Sox
 Reema Juffali – Saudi Arabian racing driver
 Jerome Daniels – Miami Dolphins, Baltimore Ravens, Arizona Cardinals.

Faculty
 M. Shahid Alam
 Auroop Ratan Ganguly –  Water & Climate Science, Data & Network Science, and Infrastructure Resilience
 Daniel P. Aldrich – expert on social capital and resilience in disaster
 Albert-László Barabási – American Physical Society Fellow, Member of the Academia Europaea and contributor to the development of real-world network theory
 Lisa Feldman Barrett – Distinguished Professor of Psychology, fellow of AAAS
 Barry Bluestone – founding director of the Kitty and Michael Dukakis Center for Urban and Regional Policy
 Ed Bullins – playwright and Guggenheim Fellow
 Joe Castiglione – MLB radio announcer
 Tim Cresswell – human geographer and poet
 Rose Laub Coser – sociologist; vice-president of the American Sociological Association; president of the Eastern Sociological Society 
 Nicholas Daniloff – correspondent for UPI and U.S. News & World Report
 Richard Deth – voice in the autism and vaccine controversy
 Michael Dukakis – former Massachusetts State Governor and 1988 Democratic Presidential Candidate
 Matthias Felleisen – author of How to Design Programs
 William M. Fowler – historian, former director of the Massachusetts Historical Society
 James Alan Fox – authority on serial killers and hate crimes
 Alexander Gorlov – ASME Thomas A. Edison Award winner; inventor of the Gorlov helical turbine
 Gary Goshgarian – author, uses the pen name Gary Braver
 Nat Hentoff – Guggenheim Fellow, Fulbright Fellow
 M. Whitney Kelting
 Harlan Lane – MacArthur Foundation Genius Award winner
 Jack Levin – authority on serial killers and hate crimes
 Karl Lieberherr – computer scientist
 Peter K. Manning – authority on the occupational culture of policing
 Pran Nath – co-developer of the theory of supergravity
 Robert B. Parker – author of the "Spenser" novels
 Rupal Patel – speech scientist and founder of VOCALiD
 Justin B. Ries – marine scientist and inventor
 Walter V. Robinson – Pulitzer-winning journalist
 Nada Sanders, Distinguished Professor of Supply Chain Management at the D’Amore-McKim School of Business
 Mikhail Shubin – member of the Russian Academy of Sciences and mathematician
 Justine Siegal – baseball coach and sports educator
 Alessandro Vespignani – American Physical Society Fellow, Member of the Academia Europaea
 Mitchell Wand – author of Essentials of Programming Languages

References

Lists of people by university or college in Massachusetts